Danger on Vampire Trail is Volume 50 of the original The Hardy Boys Mystery Stories published by Grosset & Dunlap.

This book was written for the Stratemeyer Syndicate by Andrew E. Svenson and first published in 1971.

Plot summary
The Hardy boys and two friends Chet and Biff take a camping trip to the Rocky Mountains in an attempt to locate a gang of credit card counterfeiters.

References

The Hardy Boys books
1971 American novels
1971 children's books
Grosset & Dunlap books